Cafer Tayyar Eğilmez (1877 – January 3, 1958) was an officer of the Ottoman Army and a general of the Turkish Army.

See also
List of high-ranking commanders of the Turkish War of Independence

Sources

External lınks
 Zülal Keleş, "Cafer Tayyar Paşa" , Atatürk Araştırma Merkezi Dergisi, Sayı 44, Cilt: XV, Temmuz 1999.

External links

1877 births
1958 deaths
Military personnel from Pristina
People from Kosovo vilayet
Progressive Republican Party (Turkey) politicians
Deputies of Edirne
Ottoman Army officers
Turkish Army generals
Ottoman military personnel of the Balkan Wars
Ottoman military personnel of World War I
Turkish military personnel of the Greco-Turkish War (1919–1922)
Turkish prisoners of war
Ottoman Military Academy alumni
Ottoman Military College alumni
Recipients of the Medal of Independence with Red-Green Ribbon (Turkey)
Burials at Karacaahmet Cemetery